Mahonia eurybracteata is a species of shrub in the Berberidaceae described as a species in 1901. It is endemic to China.

Subspecies
 Mahonia eurybracteata subsp. eurybracteata - Guangxi, Guizhou, Hubei, Hunan, Sichuan
 Mahonia eurybracteata subsp. ganpinensis (H.Lév.) T. S.Ying & Boufford - Guizhou, Hubei, Sichuan

References

eurybracteata
Endemic flora of China
Plants described in 1901